Bozhou (亳州) is a prefecture-level city in Anhui, China, named after the historical prefecture.

Bozhou may also refer to the following places in China:

Modern places
Bozhou District (播州), Guizhou, named after the tusi chiefdom
Bozhou, Hunan (波洲), a town in Xinhuang Dong Autonomous County, Hunan
Bortala Mongol Autonomous Prefecture, prefecture in Xinjiang, sometimes abbreviated as Bozhou (博州)
 Bozhou, Xinhuang (波洲镇),  a town of Xinhuang Dong Autonomous County, Hunan

Historical prefectures
Bo Prefecture (Anhui), prefecture between the 7th and 20th centuries in modern Anhui and Henan
Bo Prefecture (Shandong) (博州), prefecture between the 6th and 13th centuries in modern Shandong
Bozhou Tusi or Bo Prefecture (播州), prefecture and chiefdom in modern Guizhou

See also
Bo (disambiguation)